Charles Frederick Horace Frisby  Young (5 April 1819 – 29 January 1874) was an Australian actor, comedian and theatrical manager. Young was born in Doncaster, Yorkshire, England, and died in Woolloomooloo, New South Wales.

See also

 Francis Nesbitt McCrone
 George Selth Coppin
 John Thomas Smith
 Gustavus Vaughan Brooke
 Thomas Barry Sullivan
 Walter Montgomery
 Duke of Edinburgh

References

Australian male comedians
English emigrants to Australia
1819 births
1874 deaths
19th-century Australian male actors
Australian male stage actors
19th-century comedians